JFK: Coming of Age in the American Century, (1917–1956) is a 2020 biography written by Pulitzer prize winning author Fredrik Logevall. Released by Random House in 2020, the work examines the education, military service, and political career of an American president whose early years set the stage for his knowledge of international relations.  This knowledge provided him the ability as president to steer the nation through the most perilous deadlocks and short term victories of the Cold War, including the disastrous attempt to thwart Castro's communist takeover of Cuba at the Bay of Pigs, the 1962 Cuban Missile Crisis, and the beginning of military détente with the Soviet Union.

The book unveils John F. Kennedy's early relationships, his formative WWII experiences, his ideas, writings, and most significantly his political aspirations, which the author believed took shape at an early age and were independent of his father's desire for him to enter public life.  The author follows Kennedy through the birth of the Cold War, first showing Kennedy's awareness as a young journalist in 1945 of the threat of an imperialistic Russia, and noting Kennedy's grasp of international relations due in part to his Harvard education in Political Science, and his accurate feelings for the substance and motivation of the world leaders he met in his early life as a wealthy son of the U.S. ambassador to the United Kingdom.  He learned more about the international climate during his far-ranging global junkets in 1951 as a young Senator.

Author description 

Logevall, a Professor of International Affairs and History at Harvard Kennedy School, had previously written over ten books in the topics of foreign relations. In 2012, he published Embers of War: The Fall of an Empire and the Making of America’s Vietnam, which covered US motivations for entering the Vietnam War and went on to win the Pulitzer Prize for History and the Francis Parkman Prize. In 2020, he published America’s Cold War: The Politics of Insecurity, which examined the successes and failures of US involvement in the Cold War. Having published over ten books, including a Pulitzer Prize winner for History, he had the skills and writing style to make an interesting read of even the most intricately woven political drama.

Content

Family background

Logevall's heavily researched biography begins with a brief description of the life of Kennedy's grandparents, and takes note of the early life of his father Joseph as an outstanding student and high achieving athlete in High School. The author includes important detail often omitted from other works, including the early stock investments that netted Joseph P. Kennedy his first million as a trader with Hayden, Stone, and Company, and his earlier work as a manager of the Fore River Shipyard where he first met Franklin Roosevelt, who was at the time Secretary of the Navy.  Alluding to the research of Daniel Okrent and 2012 Joseph Kennedy biographer David Nasaw, Logevall found no evidence in the widely held myth that Joseph Kennedy partnered with mob figures to make a part of his fortune in bootlegging during Prohibition in the 1920s.

Lack of parental affection

Importantly, Logevall notes that Rose Kennedy's exceedingly rare display of physical affection towards her children, for which she often took criticism from other Kennedy biographers, was likely influenced by child psychologists of the day who discouraged such displays as being detrimental to proper childhood development.  Logevall observed that the authors of magazine articles of the period from 1910 to 1935, as well as the noted psychologist John B. Watson, "considered 'too much love' to be the greatest threat to a child's welfare."  Watson, author of Psychological Care of Infant and Child (1928), believed "since society does not overly comfort children as they become young adults in the real world, parents should not set up these unrealistic expectations." The widely read authority on parenting young children, L. Emmet Holt, "warned mothers against coddling children or playing with them or displaying a lot of affection with them."

Independent political aspirations

Most Kennedy historians agree that Joseph Kennedy had harbored stronger political aspirations for John's brother Joseph Kennedy Jr., whom the elder Kennedy viewed as more capable and intelligent. Central to his book's theme, Logevall strongly presses the point that Kennedy chose his career in public service and politics, and was not forced into it by his father to substitute for the life in politics Kennedy Sr. had hoped for Joe Junior, hopes that were lost when Joe Junior died prematurely in WWII.  As many former biographers including Logevall noted, JFK's more amenable personality; being less prone to temper, his accurate insight into American politics and history, and his prior public recognition probably made him a more suitable candidate for a life in politics than his brother Joe.

To support the view that Kennedy and not his father chose politics as his profession, Logevall cites Kennedy's choice of politics and history as his college major at Harvard, Kennedy's love of travel, and the author's belief that JFK was more intrigued with the prospect of a life of public service than that of working as a writer or academic. Kennedy discussed his interest in a life in politics with some of his early friends, including Inga Arvad during WWII. As noted by Logevall, in 1942, he and Arvad had mused at length about him running for office, not excluding the Presidency.  He also noted that though his father wanted him to make his first political run as Massachusetts's Lieutenant Governor, Kennedy strongly preferred a run for the House of Representatives where he could use his knowledge of foreign relations to play a stronger role in America's future.  Kennedy was in the center of world politics through his travels long before making the choice to lead a life of public service.

America's entry into WWII
At only 22, after a seven-month trip from Moscow to Jerusalem, having questioned his father's isolationism, Kennedy was in Berlin in early September 1939, to witness first hand Prime Minister Neville Chamberlain announce Britain's intent to enter the war.  Kennedy was more moved however, by Churchill's idealistic speech on September 3 as Chairman of the Admiralty that the war would "establish the rights of the individual", and would be a "war to establish and revive the stature of man." Logevall also noted that as a great admirer of Churchill, JFK's speeches may have at times been written in a similar tone and cadence.

Logevall stressed Kennedy's strong belief in the need for America to enter WWII, though it differed markedly from his father's isolationist stance as Ambassador to Britain, and noted importantly that Kennedy advised his father, after he lost his post as Ambassador to Britain on how to softly modify and explain his isolationist views.

Why England Slept, 1940

Kennedy's Senior thesis at Harvard, Why England Slept, demonstrated his knowledge that carefully studied, yet timely actions were the key to making effective foreign policy decisions, and that cool objectivity, and pragmatism should be the guiding rule. As Logevall observed, in his Senior thesis, the 21-year-old Kennedy already had a "commitment to an unsentimental realism in international affairs".  Kennedy reasoned "foreign threats could not be dealt with by ignoring them or wishing them away", rather "they must be confronted by clearheaded and informed calculation".  Though the book detailed the reasons why Great Britain was not ready for Nazi invasion in 1939, rather than castigating the popular appeasement policy that the British government then pursued, it was notable for taking the uncommon stance that if Great Britain had confronted Nazi Germany earlier it would have been far more disastrous for her than the delay caused by the appeasement policies of Chamberlain and other British leaders. The thesis's publication as a novel in 1940, largely due to the efforts and financing of Joseph Kennedy, elevated JFK's public image and aided in his future political aspirations, which had not yet fully taken form.

As noted by David Nasaw, a Joseph P. Kennedy historian, JFK also concluded that Prime Minister Chamberlain "had no choice but to appease Hitler because an antiwar, antimilitary British public had refused to spend money in the 1930s on maintaining and modernizing the British army, navy and air force".  In blaming the public, rather than the leaders of Great Britain, Kennedy walked a middle line, not casting excessive blame on either Chamberlain or Churchill for their leadership, but setting an example for future generations on the need to maintain a powerful military, a theme he took into his public life and Presidency.  The book was interpreted by some critics as an excuse for his father's appeasement of Hitler while acting as Ambassador to Great Britain, but it was more accurately a carefully studied statement on the importance of readiness in the face of potential war.

PT-109

Kennedy's service as commander of the doomed PT-109 demonstrated his leadership abilities, but also confirmed that at an early age, he knew how to use contacts, persuasion, and finesse to meet his political objectives. As he strongly felt the need for America to enter the war, he summoned his political skills to further that aim.  After being stuck with a safe posting at the Panama Canal after completion of his PT training, he desperately sought a combat assignment.  Using his own political pull, he contacted family friend and crony, Massachusetts Senator David I. Walsh, Chairman of the Naval Affairs Committee, who diverted his assignment to Panama, and had him sent to PT combat in the Solomon Islands, granting Kennedy's previous "change-of-assignment" request to be sent to a squadron in the South Pacific.  His actions were against the wishes of his father who had wanted a safer assignment.

Logevall accurately describes Kennedy's ordeal after the ramming of the 109 by the Japanese Destroyer Amagiri, and notes that the darkness, and an inability to communicate effectively by radio contributed to the loss of Kennedy's command.  But he omits the important observation of William Doyle in his book, PT-109, that serious issues with the Mark VIII torpedo played a critical role in the ineffectiveness of using PT boats against Japanese Destroyers, which were over 200 feet longer, better armed, and had both a longer gun range, and more effective torpedoes. The fourteen PT boats working with Kennedy's 109, tasked with intercepting around four Japanese Destroyers on the late evening of August 1, 1943, launched over twenty torpedoes, but not one hit their mark.  As William Doyle had written, "at 27 knots...the Mark VIII's were so slow it took great luck or skill to have a chance of hitting a Japanese destroyer barreling down at 30 knots", and "In later Navy experiments, more than 50 percent of the warheads failed to detonate". They had to be launched on an "even keel" with the surface of the water, were inaccurate at the safe range of a few thousand yards, and would habitually run closer to the surface or deeper than intended after launch, causing them to either porpoise out of the water, or go under their target. Logevall may have omitted details of the ineffectiveness of the Mark VIII torpedoes, as it is quite possible Kennedy was unaware that the torpedoes were partly responsible for the failure of his mission on August 2 in Blackett Strait.  It is important to note that Kennedy's awareness of the fallibility of military command and technology may have later prodded him to seek diplomatic solutions before fully trusting in the judgement of the Joint Chiefs that a military solution would cause the Soviets to withdraw their missiles from Cuba without provoking a dangerous and costly military conflict.

His disastrous experience after the sinking of the PT-109 left him exhausted, badly underweight, with a permanently disabled lower back, and mourning over the loss of two shipmates under his command.  Disillusioned with the brutality and futility of war, he wrote, "I should really like as my life's goal--in some way and at some point, to do something to help prevent another." The statement revealed Kennedy's early desire to make a mark in public life, and sharpened his doubts about the utility of war, particularly after he witnessed the birth of nuclear weapons in 1945.  His wariness of the effectiveness of high-ranking military decisions may have later contributed to his distrust of a purely military solution to the Cuban missile crisis.  It may have also guided him in successfully completing the Nuclear Test Ban Treaty that was a step towards limiting Russia's production of Nuclear weapons.

Early views on the Cold War, 1945
Around April 1945, after JFK had left the Navy and completed a period of physical recovery, Joe Kennedy obtained a short position as journalist for JFK with two Hearst owned newspapers.  Hearst was a personal friend and acquaintance of Kennedy's father.  For the Chicago Herald-American, and New York's Journal American, Jack covered the upcoming United Nations conference in San Francisco.  He later covered the British elections for the Hearst papers, and was surprised by Churchill's defeat against the Labor Party.  Realizing the larger powers, particularly Russia, might dominate post-War Europe, he wrote of the United Nations that "with its elaborate mechanics, the organization would prove ineffectual in resolving the great issues of war and peace, especially given that the larger countries would refuse to entrust it with sufficient decision-making powers."  He would also write "There is growing discouragement among people concerning our chances of winning any lasting peace from this war." and "There is talk of fighting the Russians in the next ten or fifteen years".  Writing for the United Nations conference, he noted that in the absence of a meaningful settlement between the two countries, "Soviet-American relations would quickly worsen," and that, "the political battle would go on and spread to Asia".

While still working for Hearst, he visited Berlin, and predicting Russia's eventual rise to power, or at least the threat of her occupying West Berlin, he wrote in his journal, "One opinion here is that the Russians are never going to pull out their zone of occupation but plan to make their part of Germany a Soviet Socialist Republic...if we don't withdraw and allow the Germans to administer their own affairs, we will be confronted with an extremely difficult administrative problem.  Yet, if we pull out, we may create a political vacuum that the Russians will be only to glad to fill".  Though not allowed to attend the Postsam convention, held in a suburb of Berlin in July and August 1945, he met or came in close contact with President Harry Truman, listened carefully to Allied commander Dwight Eisenhower, saw Army Chief of Staff George C. Marshall, as well as a number of high level state department officials including W. Averell Harriman, Charles Bohlen, John McCloy, Robert Murphy, and William Clayton.  JFK travelled with James Forrestal who was acting Secretary of the Navy, and who later attempted to recruit him for additional work with the Navy.

Later, as an early candidate for the House of Representatives in 1946, Kennedy expressed his support for the tough policy against Russian expansionism integral to Truman's administration, when he stated in a radio address, "The years ahead will be difficult and strained, the sacrifices great, but it is only by supporting with all our hearts the course we believe to be right, can we prove that that course is not only right, but that it has strength and vigor." Logevall noted that his early life could be seen, in some part, as a prelude to his American University address in June 1963, "where he urged a realistic reappraisal of the Cold War and laid the foundations for the hotly contested policy that became known as détente".

House of Representatives, 1946
Kennedy's father Joseph was quite helpful in coordinating media coverage for JFK during his first run for the national office of the Eleventh District Massachusetts's House of Representatives in 1946, though the official title of Campaign Manager was held by Mark Dalton.  JFK's personality and long hours campaigning were likely the deciding factor in his victory, nonetheless.  According to Logevall, "Joe spent hours on the phone with reporters and editors, seeking information, trading confidences, and cajoling them into publishing puff pieces on Jack, ones that invariably played up his war record in the Pacific.  He oversaw a professional advertising campaign that insured ads went up in just the right places--the campaign had a virtual monopoly on subway space, and on window stickers for cars and homes--and was the force behind the mass mailings of Hersey's PT 109 article".  The campaign also used billboards effectively.  Campaign manager Mark Dalton estimated spending around $50,000, a considerable sum but not as exorbitant as some opponents may have later estimated.

Europe and Asia, Fall 1951

In a trip to Europe and Asia in the Fall of 1951, Kennedy gained valuable insight into post-war global politics, strengthening his international relations credentials shortly before his first run for the Senate.  He visited France, Israel, Iran, Pakistan, India, Singapore, Thailand, Indonesia, French Indochina, Malaya, Burma, Korea, and Japan. Arriving first in France, he met with General Dwight D. Eisenhower at Supreme Headquarters in Paris.  In Israel he was impressed with the leadership of Prime Minister David Ben Gurion and concerned about the status of Arab refugees.  He met President Mossadegh in Iran, whom he correctly speculated would have a long stay in power, countering the opinion of less insightful British officials.  In Pakistan, he met with Prime Minister Ali Khan, shortly before his assassination, and in India was impressed with Jawaharial Nehru and Indira Gandhi.  Nehru was one of the first to advise him of the futility of the war against Ho Chi Minh in Viet Nam. Lastly, he met with the Prime Minister of Thailand before arriving in Viet Nam, where he wrote "the American people should avoid the path trod by the declining British and French empires, and instead show that the enemy is not merely Communism, but "poverty and want", "sickness and disease", and "injustice and inequality".  Perhaps demonstrating better understanding of Viet Nam under French rule than his successor Lyndon Baines Johnson, Kennedy further noted, "There is no broad support of the native Viet Nam government among the people of that area", for it is a "puppet government", and "a free election would go in favor of Ho and his Communists".  Some historians, however, have questioned if Kennedy, with his wariness of Communist expansionism, might not have eventually supported increasing American military intervention in Viet Nam.

McCarthy and emerging cold war politics

After returning from his 1951 trip to Europe and Asia, Kennedy was confronted with the emerging popularity of Joseph McCarthy, a fellow Catholic and longtime family friend.  Logevall noted that Kennedy faced the dilemma of realizing that Communism could not be effectively contained through military action as suggested by McCarthy, yet remaining fully aware the Anti-Communist passions inspired by McCarthy would influence voting trends in the next election.  McCarthy had resoundingly criticized Truman for firing General Douglas MacArthur as the military commander in Korea, and had venomously criticized George C. Marshall, believing his funding of aid to rebuild Post War Europe on behalf of the Truman Doctrine had only encouraged Soviet expansionism and resulted in strengthening and encouraging the growth of Communist China under Mao.  Kennedy knew McCarthy's attacks against alleged Communists in the state department were irrational, and he knew that containing Communism was a complex issue that would require diplomacy and economic aid, but he was hesitant to openly oppose McCarthy due to his sound public support.  Kennedy distanced himself and was understandably criticized for abstaining from the vote to censor McCarthy on December 2, 1954, though he was being hospitalized after back surgery at the time of the vote and had suffered through the year's congressional session with back pain.  The vote, which made McCarthy one of only a few senators to ever be censored in the same manner passed comfortably 67–22, without Kennedy's support.  Kennedy's failure to extend a vote to censure remained a political liability for several years, particularly among the left wing of the Democratic party.

RFK and the 1952 Senate run

Logevall describes the reasons behind Kennedy's successful run for the Senate in 1952 against Henry Cabot Lodge Jr., noting the invaluable part played by his campaign manager and brother Robert Kennedy, who had just graduated University of Virginia law school, and was at first reluctant to throw himself into the political race.  According to Logevall, Robert was "deemed ruthless, caustic, relentless, defiant, and ferocious", in his support of the campaign, though by most accounts he proved to be quite effective. Robert created an organizational structure that had campaign "secretaries" function as "shadow units" to the regular Democratic Party machinery.  A total of 286 of these Kennedy secretaries, who had no previous political allegiance to the state Democratic party, would work on Kennedy's behalf along with approximately twenty thousand volunteers.

Robert improved upon the 2,500 signatures required to get on the ballot, and reached a remarkable total of 262,324.  He then used the novel idea proposed by campaign aid David Powers of having volunteers, often women, write thank-you notes to each of the signatories, and wherever possible to hand-deliver them to cut postage costs, and increase personal impact. During this successful campaign against a far more seasoned and experienced Senatorial candidate, Kennedy began campaigning earlier, scored well in two late campaign televised debates, and through the use of teas often attended by his mother and sisters, reached approximately 70,000 women voters who may not have formerly been as engaged in politics.

Though both Lodge and Kennedy were seen by voters as intelligent candidates who discussed the issues well and avoided negative campaigning, Kennedy campaigned longer and may have conducted a more thorough public relations effort providing free copies of PT-109 articles to voters, and more broadly using the print media, often with the financial backing of Joseph Kennedy.  Logevall came to the important conclusion as to the level of JFK's sole responsibility and independence from the judgements of his father, noting, "That the two Kennedys often agreed on...big ticket items should not obscure the reality, which had already emerged well before 1952: John F. Kennedy, keen student of government and history, was always his own political boss.  He trusted his own political judgements over those of his father, who was a whiz at making money but lacked a feel for what made people tick.  The two of them saw....U.S. democracy differently.  Whenever, in an election campaign, these views clashed, Jack's prevailed."

Ted Sorensen, speech writer and strategist

As a young Senator picking his future staff around 1953, Kennedy wisely chose Ted Sorensen, who would become his primary speech writer, and the primary author of Profiles in Courage.  Logevall believed, at least as far as articulating Kennedy's vision and strategy, Sorensen was the true power behind the throne. Reiterating a theme he made throughout JFK, Logevall identified the trait Kennedy found most important in Sorensen's own self evaluation, "The liberal who is rationally committed is more reliable than the liberal who is emotionally committed."  Not surprisingly, the ability to base political decisions on objective intellect rather than passion may have been what Logevall considered Kennedy's most distinguishing and empowering political asset.

Profiles in Courage 1954–5
Despite criticism from a number of journalists who believed Kennedy should not have claimed sole authorship for Profiles in Courage due to Sorensen's extensive contributions, Logevall wrote that in several ways Kennedy may have played the more essential role in the book, noting importantly that "Kennedy made the final choices about which figures (senators) to feature in the book.  And although Sorensen took the lead role in drafting the bulk of the chapters, with significant input on most of them from Georgetown University Professor of Diplomatic history Jules Davids, and Harvard Law Dean and economist James M. Landis, the senator (Kennedy) was responsible for the book's architecture, themes, and arguments." Landis, an associate of Joseph Kennedy Sr., would later act as Special Counsel during Kennedy's term as president.  Kennedy, who may have been primarily responsible for the content of about a quarter of the volume, was especially critical to the first and the last chapters, as well as a large portion of Chapter 2 on John Quincy Adams.  He also wrote the Introduction, which laid out some of the book's central theme, which centered on Kennedy's hope that as legislators and perhaps even citizens, "We can compromise our political positions but not ourselves.  We can resolve the clash of interests without conceding our ideals".  He went on to write, "compromise need not mean cowardice.  Indeed, it is frequently the compromisers and conciliators who are faced with the severest tests of political courage as it is frequently the compromisers and conciliators who are faced with the severest tests of political courage as they oppose the extremist views of their constituents, as their loyalty to the nation triumphs over all personal considerations".
    
Logevall went on to add that Sorensen, though a highly capable writer, as a political novice didn't have Kennedy's ability to reflect on the importance and place of compromise in political life, nor was he as knowledgeable about American history as Kennedy.  According to Logevall, and attested to by both Jackie Kennedy, and many friends, Kennedy worked for many weeks on the book during his long and painful recovery from back surgery, noting, "often he worked while prone in bed, on heavy white paper in his loose, widely spaced hand; on better days he was propped up on the patio or the porch."  Further, Kennedy played a highly active role in initially locating research sources, for "on an almost daily basis, Sorensen recalled, Kennedy sent him instructions about "books to ship down, memoranda to prepare, sources to check, materials to assemble."  Kennedy instructed Sorensen to scan more than two hundred books, journals, magazines, (and) Congressional records. Sorensen later noted, "the way Jack worked was to take all the material, mine and his, pencil it, dictate the fresh copy in his own words, pencil it again, he never used a typewriter".

Vice-Presidential run, 1956
The book ends with Kennedy's unsuccessful run for the Vice-Presidential nomination under what would become the failed Presidential candidacy of Adlai Stevenson II who had the misfortune of running against the strikingly popular incumbent Dwight Eisenhower in 1956.  It may have been beneficial for Kennedy's future political career that he was not chosen as vice-president by Stevenson.  The experience gave Kennedy his first taste of national politics, and began self-speculation that he might someday have a larger impact on the world stage.

Critical reviews
David Kennedy of the New York Times Book Review writes that after a careful study of Kennedy's prep school and college essays, and an analysis of his Harvard Senior thesis, Why England Slept, "a picture emerges of an uncommonly curious, sometimes frivolous but increasingly earnest young man on his way to shaping an informed, clear-eyed, unsentimental sense of the world and his nation's place in it".  He goes on to note that "John F. Kennedy's individual journey of separation from his father's isolationism tracked the progression of the United States in midcentury from peripheral international player to the singularly most dominant political and economical global power".

Evan Thomas of the Washington Post emphasized Logevall's depiction of Kennedy's centrism, pragmatism, and ability to distance himself to remain objective as a politician.  Thomas's review notes that Kennedy was "passionate about politics — an honorable profession, he believed — but he was never polemical or even terribly partisan. He knew that it could take courage to be a moderate, to find the middle way. His heroes were the politicians who compromised on policy but not principle."  As a result, Thomas was somewhat critical of Kennedy's positive but sly policy towards civil rights, but acknowledged Kennedy knew that a stronger effort to pursue a civil rights agenda could fatally damage his support in the South.  Thomas believed Logevall demonstrated with conviction that although Sorensen certainly improved Kennedy's writing style, spelling and grammar in Profiles in Courage, and completed the majority of the final draft, the primary themes and insights were Kennedy's.

David Runsiman of the UK Guardian writes a strongly positive review, but considers John Kennedy's character to be less clearly defined than that of his powerful father or his more steely younger brother Robert.  He views Joseph Senior as "dominating", "frightful" and "formidable", though he still considers Logevall to be sympathetic to his role.  He notes more importantly that unlike Joseph Senior, "JFK was extraordinarily skilled at creating the right impression", but considers his character to be less clearly defined.  I would disagree with his appraisal of JFK somewhat, as I find him well defined, but certainly less domineering that his father Joe or his brother Robert. Runsiman believes Bobby did Jack's "dirty work", though this is a role often assigned to Bobby by other less well researched authors.

Adding fuel to the fire that Kennedy acted largely independently in seeking a political career, Kirus Reviews noted that "as early as 1944, Logevall reveals, JFK was meeting with political operatives to identify opportunities".

Publishers Weekly notes that Logevall "writes vividly of the hothouse Kennedy family culture, but also widens his lens to take in the forces of war, politics, and television that shaped JFK's worldview and career".  Their review mentions that Kennedy's portrait still feels romanticized, particularly in its portrayal of Kennedy's charisma, but the author also informs his audience of the rich substance behind Kennedy's glamorous trappings.

Further reading
 Nasaw, David, The Patriarch: The Remarkable Life and Turbulent Times of Joseph P. Kennedy, (November 2012), Penguin Press
 Dallek, Robert, An Unfinished Life: John F. Kennedy, 1917–1963 (2003) New York, Little Brown Publishers.
 Hamilton, Nigel, JFK Reckless Youth, (1992) New York, Random Press
 Doyle, William, PT 109: An American Epic of War, Survival, and the Destiny of John F. Kennedy, (2015) William Morrow, a Division of Harper Collins, Random Press,

Book notes and references

Books about foreign relations of the United States
Books about international relations
Books about politics of the United States
Non-fiction books about diplomacy
2020 non-fiction books
American biographies
Biographies of John F. Kennedy
American non-fiction books
American political books
Biographies about politicians
Books about American politicians
American history books
Random House books